A Love is a 1999 Italian romance film written and directed by Gianluca Maria Tavarelli and starring Fabrizio Gifuni and Lorenza Indovina.

Plot

Cast  

Lorenza Indovina as Sara
Fabrizio Gifuni as  Marco
Luciano Federico as  Filippo
 Roberta Lena as   Veronica
 Riccardo Montanaro as  The  Investigator 
 Ezio Sega as  The Professor

See also  
 List of Italian films of 1999

References

External links

  
 

Italian romance films
1990s romance films
1990s Italian films